is a Japanese actress, voice actress and singer from Ibaraki Prefecture, Japan.

Biography

She was known for her role as Lulula Franc, a Cherrybaiter in 1997 Face/SNK's Neo Geo puzzle game Money Puzzle Exchanger.

Filmography

Television animation
Pocket Monsters (1997) - Kasumi's Tattu (Misty's Horsea)
Pocket Monsters Side Stories (2002) - Kasumi's Tattu (Misty's Horsea) and Sakura's Agehunt (Sakura's Beautifly)
World Trigger (2014) – Kaho Mikami
Chibi Maruko-chan (2016) – Sakiko Sakura, Uchida, Wakabayashi – replaced Yuko Mizutani

Unknown date
Hunter × Hunter (Second Series) - Asta and Khara
Gitaroo Man – Pico and Kirah
Ground Defense Force! Mao-chan - Emi Uehara and Shoko Akasaka
Growlanser & Growlanser II: The Sense of Justice – Misha
Konjiki no Gash Bell!! – Shion Hibiki
One Piece – Kuina
Sailor Moon SuperS – PallaPalla
Saint Seiya Hades Chapter – young Phoenix Ikki
Weiß Kreuz Glühen – Asami-sensei
Mermaid Saga – Toukichi
Cyborg 009 – Francois Alnul/Cyborg 003

Original video animation
Kirara (2000) – Amy

Animated films
Street Fighter II: The Animated Movie (1994) – Indian girl

Video games
Money Puzzle Exchanger (1997) - Lulula Franc/Cherrybaiter
Sentimental Graffiti (2001) – Manami Sugihara
Reveal Fantasia (2002) – Fiona

References

External links
Official blog 
Official agency profile 

1971 births
Living people
Aoni Production voice actors
Japanese women singers
Japanese stage actresses
Japanese video game actresses
Japanese voice actresses
Meiji University alumni
Voice actresses from Ibaraki Prefecture
20th-century Japanese actresses
21st-century Japanese actresses